The Keyser–Cullen House, at 941 East 500 South in Salt Lake City, Utah, was built in 1879.  It was listed on the National Register of Historic Places in 1999.

It is a brick two-story cross-wing house.  Its original section, a west-facing two-room-plan building was built in 1879; the wing extending to the west from that was added in the mid-1880s.  It has a gabled roof, with bargeboard trim in the cross wing gable. It has some elements of Gothic Revival style.

It was built by and home of Aaron Keyser, a cattle baron and brewer, c. 1879–1883. Subsequently, it was home for 35 years for Matthew Cullen, silver miner and owner of Cullen Hotel in Salt Lake City.

References

National Register of Historic Places in Salt Lake City
Gothic Revival architecture in Utah
Houses completed in 1879